Odi Vilaiyaadu Paapa is a 1959 Indian Tamil-language film directed by V. Srinivasan. The film stars S. S. Rajendran and B. Saroja Devi.

Plot

Cast 
Credits adapted from Saadhanaigal Padaitha thamizh thiraipada varalaru:
 S. S. Rajendran as Subramaniyan
 B. Saroja Devi as Bharathi
 P. K. Balachandran
G. Sakunthala
 K. Mohan
 Santhi
 Sahadevan
 Angamuthu
 S. V. Sahasranamam
 K. Varalakshmi

Production 
Odi Vilaiyaadu Paapa shares its name with a poem written by Tamil poet Subramania Bharati. It was directed by V. Srinivasan (who later became popularly known as Muktha Srinivasan) and produced by the studio Jagajothi Films. The story and dialogues were written by K. Appannaraj, while the cinematography was handled by Sampath and E. N. Balakrishnan. The art director was Angamuthu, the editor was N. G. Rajan and the music director was V. Krishnamoorthy, while the lyrics were written by Kambadasan. Bharati was also credited as lyricist.

Soundtrack 
The music was composed by V. Krishnamoorthy. Lyrics were penned by Mahakavi Subramania Bharathiyar & Kambadasan. Playback singers are Seerkazhi Govindarajan, P. B. Sreenivas, Radha Jayalakshmi, S. Janaki & P. Susheela.

Release and reception 
Odi Vilaiyaadu Paapa was released on 25 September 1959, and failed commercially. Srinivasa Rao, editor of Narada magazine criticised Srinivasan for directing the film to show his prowess, and not giving any less financially well-off person or newcomer the chance to direct.

References

External links 
 

1950s Tamil-language films
Films directed by Muktha Srinivasan